Century Textiles Office Tower is an office-use skyscraper under construction in Mumbai, India. It is located in Lower Parel, Worli, Mumbai.

Construction update
 N/A

See also
 List of tallest buildings in Delhi
 India Tower
 Palais Royale, Mumbai
 World One

References

Buildings and structures under construction in India
Skyscraper office buildings in Mumbai